Vārkava Parish is an administrative unit of Preiļi Municipality in the Latgale region of Latvia.

Towns, villages and settlements of Vārkava Parish 
The central village in the parish is Vārkava.  The village, parish, and surrounding municipality are also called Vorkova in the Latgalian language.

Parishes of Latvia
Preiļi Municipality
Latgale